Okanagan North was a provincial electoral district in the Canadian province of British Columbia beginning with the election of 1979.

Former provincial electoral districts of British Columbia